Eightmile Creek is a stream in Wasco County and Hood River County, Oregon, in the United States. It is a tributary of Fifteenmile Creek.

Eightmile Creek was named from its distance,  from The Dalles.

References

External Links

Rivers of Wasco County, Oregon
Rivers of Hood River County, Oregon
Rivers of Oregon